Isack Aloyce Kamwelwe (born April 30, 1956) is a Tanzanian politician and a member of the Chama Cha Mapinduzi political party. He was elected MP representing Katavi in 2015. He is also the Minister of Transport in Tanzania.

References 

Living people
1956 births
Members of the National Assembly (Tanzania)
Tanzanian MPs 2015–2020
Chama Cha Mapinduzi politicians
Chama Cha Mapinduzi MPs
Tanzanian Roman Catholics